The church of the Santissima Annunziata is a 16th-century, Roman Catholic church located in the center of Barga, region of Tuscany, Italy.

History
The church was built in a Latin-cross layout in 1595 around a venerated icon of the Virgin. An altarpiece on the right has a canvas depicting a Madonna and child and Saints by Baccio Ciarpi. In the choir are frescoes depicting the Marriage of the Virgin and Presentation at the Temple.

References

External links

Roman Catholic churches in Tuscany
Churches in the province of Lucca
16th-century Roman Catholic church buildings in Italy
Roman Catholic churches completed in 1595
1595 establishments in Italy
Buildings and structures in Barga, Tuscany